The Ridge Valley Rural Historic District is an area of Ottsville, Tinicum Township, Bucks County, Pennsylvania that includes Sheephole and Geigel Hill Roads. The area contains 19th century farms, many of which have stayed the same through preservation efforts. There are 44 buildings and 15 structure on the seven sites throughout the historic district.

It was added to the National Register of Historic Places in 1992.

See also
 List of Registered Historic Places in Bucks County, Pennsylvania

References

Historic districts in Bucks County, Pennsylvania
Historic districts on the National Register of Historic Places in Pennsylvania
National Register of Historic Places in Bucks County, Pennsylvania